The Legend Beautiful is a 1915 American silent short drama film directed by Tom Ricketts. It stars William Garwood in the lead role with Perry Banks and Jack Richardson.

Cast
 William Garwood as Jose Cordero
 Perry Banks as Amelio Cordero
 Jack Richardson as Pietro Cordero
 Ed Coxen as The Christ
 Vivian Rich as Rachael
 Reaves Eason as Rachael's father
 Louise Lester as Rachael's mother
 Harry von Meter as A Padre
 Joseph Knight as The Strange Gringo
 Jack O'Brien as Prospector
 Genevieve Arellanes as Leah, Pietro's daughter
 Hugh Bennett as Poor old man
 Harry Edmondson as Blind man
 Grace Knight as Feeble woman
 Arthur Melett as A monk
 William Vaughn as Beggar

External links

1915 films
1915 drama films
Silent American drama films
American silent short films
American black-and-white films
1915 short films
Films directed by Tom Ricketts
1910s American films